PEC Broadcasting Corporation is a Philippine radio network. Its main office is located at PECBC Broadcast Center, Capitol-Bonbon Rd., Imadejas Subd., Butuan. PECBC operates a number of stations across regional places in Mindanao & Visayas under the Real Radio brand.

PECBC Stations

FM Stations

TV Stations

References

Radio stations in the Philippines
Philippine radio networks